Jesper Grænge Lindstrøm (born 29 February 2000), also known as Jobbe, is a Danish professional footballer who plays as a midfielder for Bundesliga club Eintracht Frankfurt and the Denmark national team.

Lindstrøm made his full international debut for Denmark on 11 November 2020 against Sweden. He has also represented Denmark at under-19 and under-21 levels.

Club career

Brøndby

Early career
Lindstrøm began his career at Tåstrup B.70 at age three, close to where he lived with his family in Høje-Tåstrup. When his parents divorced, he moved to Brøndby with his mother as a six-year-old, and began playing for BSI within a stone's throw from his new home. He only played there for six months, as the school he attended closed, and he joined Vallensbæk IF closer to his new school on the recommendation of his stepfather's friend, coach Henrik From, the father of Rasmus From, a goalkeeper who has played for the Nordsjælland academy as well as VSK Aarhus. He then joined the academy at Danish top side Brøndby IF at under-13 level, a club which his family supported.

In August 2018, he signed a three-year contract with the club. He made his first team debut, aged 18, as a substitute in a 4–1 win over Danish third tier side BK Marienlyst in the Danish Cup on 22 November 2018. Eventually, he was promoted to the first team in the summer of 2019.

2019–20
Lindstrøm made his breakthrough for the first team in the 2019–20 season under new coach Niels Frederiksen. On 11 July, Lindstrøm made his first European appearance for Brøndby, coming on as a substitute in the first leg of their UEFA Europa League qualification round against Inter Turku. On 28 July, he made his first start and scored the first senior goal of his career to contribute to a 3–2 victory in a league match against OB. On 1 August, he came on as a substitute in the last minute of regulation and scored two goals in extra time as Brøndby defeated Lechia Gdańsk 4-1 (5-3 aggregate) in the second round of Europa League qualification. Due to his performances in the first months of the 2019–20 season, he received a lot of attention and was pointed out as the club's jóia da coroa (crown jewel) in a scouting report by Braga, Brøndby's opponent in Europa League qualifiers. After the COVID-19 pandemic had suspended the Superliga for some months, Lindstrøm scored the club's first goal in competition after the return, securing a 1–0 win over SønderjyskE on 2 June 2020.

On 3 July 2020, Lindstrøm signed a new contract with Brøndby, keeping him at the club until 2023. He finished his first season at senior level with 33 total appearances in which he scored five goals.

2020–21
Lindstrøm started the 2020–21 season strong, as he scored the 1–1 equaliser in a 2–1 away win over rivals Copenhagen on the second-matchday of the season on 20 September 2020. After the match he stated that "[i]t's crazy. There is not much more to say. It's insane. It doesn't matter who scored the goals. Our win is the most important thing, and that we have started in the Superliga season with six points is insane." On 2 October, Lindstrøm was named Superliga Young Player of the Month for September, registering two goals and one assist during the month. He scored again on 24 October, in a 3–2 home loss to Midtjylland, his third goal of the season. His strong form continued in November, with one-goal performances against OB and Vejle Boldklub and finally a brace on 30 November against Lyngby Boldklub to propel Brøndby to first place in the league table. His performances led to him being named Superliga Player of the Month for November, as well as Young Player of the Month. In December, he was voted the Tipsbladet Player of the Fall, the first time a Brøndby player won the award since Peter Graulund in 2000.

Lindstrøm continued in strong fashion during the championship play-offs, in which he was in the starting line-up in each of his seven appearances and scored one goal. At the end of the season, Brøndby claimed their first Danish Superliga title in 16 years, despite Lindstrøm being out with a suspension for the final two games of the season.

Eintracht Frankfurt
On 11 July 2021, it was announced via official channels that Lindstrøm had signed with Bundesliga club Eintracht Frankfurt on a five-year contract. He made his debut on 8 August in a 2–0 loss in the DFB-Pokal to 3. Liga club Waldhof Mannheim. His domestic league debut followed six days later, on the opening day of the Bundesliga, where he came on as a half-time substitute for Aymen Barkok in a 5–2 loss to Borussia Dortmund away at Westfalenstadion. On 21 August, he made his first start under manager Oliver Glasner in the 0–0 home draw against FC Augsburg. After mixed performances to start the season, he recorded a last-minute assist to Jens Petter Hauge in an important 2–1 group stage victory in the UEFA Europa League against Olympiacos on 2 November. On 21 November, Lindstrøm scored his first goal for Eintracht Frankfurt in a 2–0 win over SC Freiburg, toe-poking the ball past Mark Flekken inside the area. He continued his strong performances in December, scoring in league appearances against Bayer Leverkusen, Borussia Mönchengladbach and Mainz 05 to earn him the award of Bundesliga Rookie of the Month.

In the second half of the 2021–22 season, he grew into an undisputed starter in attacking midfield next to Daichi Kamada and behind lone striker Rafael Borré. His performances earned him the award of Bundesliga Rookie of the Season. In the Europa League, Lindstrøm reached the final with Frankfurt after knocking out Real Betis, Barcelona and West Ham United. In the final on 18 May 2022 against Rangers, he featured in the starting eleven before being substituted for Hauge in the 70th minute, as Frankfurt won the title after a penalty shoot-out.

On 13 September 2022, he scored his first Champions League goal in a 1–0 away win against Marseille. This was also the first Champions League victory in the history of the club and the club's first goal scored in the tournament.

International career

Youth career and early senior career
Lindstrøm won three caps for Denmark at under-19 level.

On 29 September 2020, Lindstrøm was named in manager Albert Capella's squad for the 2021 UEFA European Under-21 Championship qualifiers against Malta and Finland. He made his debut on 9 October, in a 3–1 win over Malta, scoring his first goal in the dying minutes of the game to secure the win.
Lindstrøm was included in the 23-person squad for the 2021 European Under-21 Championship.

On 9 November 2020, Lindstrøm was called up to Kasper Hjulmand's senior squad for the friendly against Sweden due to several cancellations from, among others, the Danish national team players playing in England, due to the COVID-19 restrictions, as well as a case of COVID-19 in the squad, which had put several national team players in quarantine. He came on as a substitute in the second-half during the match against Sweden at Brøndby Stadium in his debut match, on 11 November 2020.

2022 FIFA World Cup
On 7 November 2022, Lindstrøm was called up to the Denmark squad for the 2022 World Cup in Qatar. On 22 November 2022, he made his debut in a major tournament in Denmark's opening World Cup game against Tunisia, coming on as a replacement for Andreas Skov Olsen in the 65th minute of a 0–0 draw at Education City Stadium.

Career statistics

Club

International

Scores and results list Denmark's goal tally first, score column indicates score after each Lindstrøm goal.

Honours 
Brøndby
Danish Superliga: 2020–21

Eintracht Frankfurt
UEFA Europa League: 2021–22

Individual
Superliga Young Player of the Month: September 2020, October 2020, November 2020
Superliga Player of the Month: November 2020
Brøndby Player of the Month: September 2020, October 2020, November 2020
Tipsbladet Player of the Fall: 2020
Bundesliga Rookie of the Month: December 2021
Bundesliga Rookie of the Season: 2021–22

References

External links 
 
 Jesper Lindstrøm at brondby.com
 

2000 births
Living people
People from Høje-Taastrup Municipality
Footballers from Copenhagen
Danish men's footballers
Association football midfielders
Denmark international footballers
Denmark youth international footballers
Denmark under-21 international footballers
Danish Superliga players
Bundesliga players
Taastrup FC players
Brøndby IF players
Eintracht Frankfurt players
UEFA Europa League winning players
2022 FIFA World Cup players
Danish expatriate men's footballers
Danish expatriate sportspeople in Germany
Expatriate footballers in Germany